"Massachusetts" is a song with words and music by Arlo Guthrie. The song, originally released as a cut on Guthrie's 1976 album Amigo, was adopted by the Legislature in July 1981 as the official folk song of the Commonwealth of Massachusetts.

References

External links 
 M.G.L. 2:20, the law designating the official folk song of Massachusetts
 Lyrics
 Download a recorded version

United States state songs
1976 songs
American folk songs
Music of Massachusetts
Songs written by Arlo Guthrie
Arlo Guthrie songs
Songs about Massachusetts